Spittle may refer to:

Another term for saliva
Fasting spittle used a cure
The Spittles coastline in Dorset, UK
Spittle bug, a type of Hemipteran insects
Spittle (surname)

See also
Spittler (surname)